USS Delta was a steamship used by the Union Navy during the American Civil War. She was used by the Navy to patrol navigable waterways of the Confederacy to prevent the South from trading with other countries.

Service history
Delta — a steam tugboat — was purchased as Linda at Philadelphia, Pennsylvania, 3 June 1864, and renamed Delta on 27 November. She was also known as Tug No. 4. Delta was sent to Hampton Roads, Virginia, to be fitted as a torpedo (mine) tug, and operated in the James River until 28 March 1865. She was transferred to the sounds of North Carolina for duty, and for a short time in April 1865 was placed at the disposal of the Union Army with four other torpedo tugs. Delta was sent to New York at the close of the war and sold there on 5 September.

References
 

Ships of the Union Navy
Steamships of the United States Navy
Tugs of the United States Navy
Torpedo boats of the United States Navy
American Civil War patrol vessels of the United States